Getting the Last Laugh was a comedy TV movie special produced by the Landsburg Company, and first broadcast on the ABC network in 1985. It consisted of multiple segments with humorous tips to get revenge on the things that annoy us in everyday life. Guest stars included Danny Thomas, Shirley Jones, Rona Barrett, Ray Parker Jr., Jerry Mathers, and Barbara Billingsley. It was written by Fred Willard and Shelley Ross. In one segment, Ray Parker Jr. reprises his hit Ghostbusters theme ("Who you gonna call?") in a parody poking fun at uncooperative machines, with cameo appearances by Richard Simmons, Hervé Villechaize, Barbara Billingsley, and Rene Auberjonois.

References

External links
 

American comedy television films
1985 television films
1985 films
1985 comedy films
1980s English-language films
1980s American films